Area code 831 is a telephone area code in the North American Numbering Plan (NANP) for a small region of the U.S. state of California. The numbering plan area (NPA) comprises Monterey County, San Benito County, and Santa Cruz County. The area code was created on July 11, 1998 in a split from area code 408.

Service area
The service area of NPA 831 includes Big Sur, Monterey Bay, the Salinas Valley, and the southwestern Santa Cruz Mountains.

Major cities in the area are Salinas, Hollister, Monterey, Santa Cruz and places in the northern Central Coast.

Monterey County

 Aromas
 Big Sur
 Boronda
 Carmel Highlands
 Carmel Valley Village
 Carmel-by-the-Sea
 Castroville
 Chualar
 Del Monte Forest
 Del Rey Oaks
 Elkhorn
 Gonzales
 Gorda
 Greenfield
 Jolon
 King City
 Las Lomas
 Lockwood
 Marina
 Monterey
 Moss Landing
 Pacific Grove
 Pajaro
 Pebble Beach
 Prunedale
 Salinas
 San Ardo
 San Lucas
 Sand City
 Seaside
 Soledad
 Spreckels

San Benito County

 Aromas
 Hollister
 New Idria
 Paicines
 Panoche
 Ridgemark
 San Juan Bautista
 Tres Pinos

Santa Cruz County

 Amesti
 Aptos Hills-Larkin Valley
 Aptos
 Ben Lomond
 Bonny Doon
 Boulder Creek
 Brookdale
 Capitola
 Corralitos
 Davenport
 Day Valley
 Felton
 Freedom
 Interlaken
 Live Oak
 Lompico
 Mount Hermon
 Opal Cliffs
 Pasatiempo
 Rio del Mar
 Santa Cruz
 Scotts Valley
 Soquel
 Summit
 Swanton
 Twin Lakes
 Watsonville

See also
 List of California area codes

References

External links

831
Monterey County, California
San Benito County, California
Santa Cruz County, California
Salinas Valley
Santa Cruz Mountains
831